This page is an overview of the list of protected heritage sites in Liège Province, alphabetically ordered by town name. This list is part of the national heritage of Belgium.

List of protected heritage sites, in Amay
List of protected heritage sites, in Amel
List of protected heritage sites, in Ans
List of protected heritage sites, in Anthisnes
List of protected heritage sites, in Aubel
List of protected heritage sites, in Awans
List of protected heritage sites, in Aywaille
List of protected heritage sites, in Baelen
List of protected heritage sites, in Berloz
List of protected heritage sites, in Beyne-Heusay
List of protected heritage sites, in Bassenge
List of protected heritage sites, in Blegny
List of protected heritage sites, in Waremme
List of protected heritage sites, in Braives
List of protected heritage sites, in Burdinne
List of protected heritage sites, in Burg-Reuland
List of protected heritage sites, in Büllingen
List of protected heritage sites, in Bütgenbach
List of protected heritage sites, in Chaudfontaine
List of protected heritage sites, in Clavier, Liège
List of protected heritage sites, in Comblain-au-Pont
List of protected heritage sites, in Crisnée
List of protected heritage sites, in Dalhem
List of protected heritage sites, in Dison
List of protected heritage sites, in Donceel
List of protected heritage sites, in Engis
List of protected heritage sites, in Esneux
List of protected heritage sites, in Eupen
List of protected heritage sites, in Faimes
List of protected heritage sites, in Ferrières
List of protected heritage sites, in Fexhe-le-Haut-Clocher
List of protected heritage sites, in Flémalle
List of protected heritage sites, in Fléron
List of protected heritage sites, in Geer
List of protected heritage sites, in Grâce-Hollogne
List of protected heritage sites, in Hamoir
List of protected heritage sites, in Hannut
List of protected heritage sites, in Héron
List of protected heritage sites, in Herstal
List of protected heritage sites, in Herve
List of protected heritage sites, in Huy
List of protected heritage sites, in Jalhay

List of protected heritage sites, in Juprelle
List of protected heritage sites, in Kelmis
List of protected heritage sites, in Lierneux
List of protected heritage sites, in Lincent
List of protected heritage sites, in Limbourg
List of protected heritage sites, in Lontzen
List of protected heritage sites, in Liège
List of protected heritage sites, in Malmedy
List of protected heritage sites, in Marchin
List of protected heritage sites, in Modave
List of protected heritage sites, in Nandrin
List of protected heritage sites, in Neupré
List of protected heritage sites, in Oreye
List of protected heritage sites, in Olne
List of protected heritage sites, in Ouffet
List of protected heritage sites, in Oupeye
List of protected heritage sites, in Pepinster
List of protected heritage sites, in Plombières
List of protected heritage sites, in Raeren
List of protected heritage sites, in Remicourt
List of protected heritage sites, in Saint-Georges-sur-Meuse
List of protected heritage sites, in Saint-Nicolas
List of protected heritage sites, in Sankt-Vith
List of protected heritage sites, in Seraing
List of protected heritage sites, in Soumagne
List of protected heritage sites, in Spa
List of protected heritage sites, in Sprimont
List of protected heritage sites, in Stavelot
List of protected heritage sites, in Stoumont
List of protected heritage sites, in Theux
List of protected heritage sites, in Thimister-Clermont
List of protected heritage sites, in Tinlot
List of protected heritage sites, in Trois-Ponts
List of protected heritage sites, in Trooz
List of protected heritage sites, in Verlaine
List of protected heritage sites, in Verviers
List of protected heritage sites, in Villers-le-Bouillet
List of protected heritage sites, in Wanze
List of protected heritage sites, in Wasseiges
List of protected heritage sites, in Waimes
List of protected heritage sites, in Welkenraedt
List of protected heritage sites, in Visé

 
 *Liege